Westcourt may refer to:
 Westcourt, Callan, Co. Kilkenny, Ireland
 Westcourt, Queensland, a suburb of Cairns in Australia
 Westcourt, Wiltshire, a hamlet in England
 Westcourt Manor, a manor house on the Isle of Wight, England